Alain Manesson Mallet (1630–1706) was a French cartographer and engineer. He started his career as a soldier in the army of Louis XIV, became a Sergeant-Major in the artillery and an Inspector of Fortifications.  He also served under the King of Portugal, before returning to France, and his appointment to the court of Louis XIV.  His military engineering and mathematical background led to his position teaching mathematics at court.

His major publications were Description de L'Univers (1683) in 5 volumes, and Les Travaux de Mars ou l'Art de la Guerre (1684) in 3 volumes.

His Description de L'Universe contains a wide variety of information, including star maps, maps of the ancient and modern world, and a synopsis of the customs, religion and government of the many nations included in his text.  It has been suggested that his background as a teacher led to his being concerned with entertaining his readers.  This concern manifested itself in the charming harbour scenes and rural landscapes that he included beneath his description of astronomical concepts and diagrams.  Mallet himself drew most of the figures that were engraved for this book.

References

Further reading
 
 v.1
 v.2: Asia
 v.3: Africa
All Mallet maps and views from different editions (1683-1719) available at http://www.columbia.edu/itc/mealac/pritchett/00generallinks/mallet/

Images

Treatises on line: http://architectura.cesr.univ-tours.fr/Traite/Auteur/Manesson_Mallet.asp?param=en

French cartographers
French military engineers
1630 births
1706 deaths
17th-century cartographers
17th-century French people
18th-century French people